Jesús Rodríguez Almeida (born 24 November 1971) is a Mexican politician. He served as Interim Governor of Puebla from 24 December 2018 to 21 January 2019. He became interim governor when Martha Erika Alonso Hidalgo died in the 2018 Puebla helicopter crash. On 21 January 2019 the Congress of Puebla elected Guillermo Pacheco Pulido as the new Acting Governor of Puebla.

References

1971 births
Living people
Politicians from Mexico City
21st-century Mexican politicians
Governors of Puebla
National Action Party (Mexico) politicians